Ammochori (before 1927: Πεσόνιτσα - Pesonitsa) is a village in Florina regional unit, Western Macedonia, Greece.

The Greek census (1920) recorded 796 people in the village and in 1923 there were 60 inhabitants (or 8 families) who were Muslim. Following the Greek-Turkish population exchange, in 1926 within Pesonitsa there were refugee families from Asia Minor (2), Pontus (29) and the Caucasus (17). The Greek census (1928) recorded 1092 village inhabitants. There were 49 refugee families (195 people) in 1928.

References

Populated places in Florina (regional unit)